The 2014 Man Booker Prize for fiction was awarded at a ceremony on 14 October 2014. Until 2014, only novels written in English and from authors in the Commonwealth, including the UK, the Republic of Ireland and Zimbabwe were eligible for consideration; however from 2014 rules were changed to extend eligibility to any novel written in English. It is therefore the first time in the award's history that authors from the United States of America have been included.

Judging panel
The panel of judges was chaired by A. C. Grayling and comprised Jonathan Bate, Sarah Churchwell, Daniel Glaser, Alastair Niven and Erica Wagner.

Nominees

Longlist
A longlist of thirteen titles was announced on 23 July 2014.

Shortlist
The shortlist of six novels was announced on 9 September 2014. It was composed of:

Winner
On 14 October, chair judge A. C. Grayling announced that Australian author Richard Flanagan had won the 2014 Man Booker Prize for his book The Narrow Road to the Deep North. The judges spent three hours deliberating before announcing the winner. Grayling described the historical novel as a "remarkable love story as well as a story about human suffering and comradeship".

See also
 List of winners and shortlisted authors of the Booker Prize for Fiction

References

Man Booker
Booker Prizes by year
2014 awards in the United Kingdom